The Black Bulga State Conservation Area is a protected conservation area located near the Barrington Tops, in the Hunter Region of New South Wales, Australia.

Features
In 2013 the status of this park as a State Conservation Area was threatened by a Government of New South Wales recommendation to allow logging in national parks. The Black Bulga Range Action Group (a group of local residents and concerned individuals who helped the park to be converted to State Conservation Area in 2003) worked to successfully ensure the continued protection of this unique bushland area.

Flora includes wet sclerophyll eucalyptus forest. This area was logged for trees such as Sydney blue gum, tallowwood, white mahogany and spotted gum. Rainforest tree species include Australian red cedar, scentless rosewood, native tamarind, citronella and rose maple. Tall grass trees grow at higher altitudes.

Koalas, eastern grey kangaroos, red-necked wallabies and greater gliders are some of the many marsupial animals found here.

See also

 Protected areas of New South Wales

References 

Dungog Shire
Forests of New South Wales
State conservation areas in New South Wales
2003 establishments in Australia
Protected areas established in 2003